is a scrolling shooter video game developed and published by Square for the Nintendo Entertainment System and MSX. The game was released in Japan on September 18, 1986 and in North America in 1989. It was later re-released for the Wii's Virtual Console in Japan on November 27, 2007 and in North America on March 24, 2008. This would be followed by a release on the Virtual Console in Japan on February 4, 2015 for 3DS and July 6, 2016 for Wii U.

The game became Square's first North American release under their Redmond subsidiary Squaresoft, and their first release as an independent company. The 1986 release's title screen credits Workss for programming. King's Knight saw a second release in 1987 on the NEC PC-8801mkII SR and the Sharp X1. These versions of the game were retitled King's Knight Special and released exclusively in Japan. It was the first game designed by Hironobu Sakaguchi for the Famicom. Nobuo Uematsu provided the musical score for King's Knight. It was Uematsu's third work of video game music composition.

Plot 
King's Knight follows a basic storyline similar to many NES-era role-playing video games: Princess Claire of Olthea has been kidnapped in the Kingdom of Izander, and the player must choose one of the four heroes (the knight/warrior "Ray Jack", the wizard "Kaliva", the monster/gigant "Barusa" and the (kid) thief "Toby") to train and set forth to attack Gargatua Castle, defeat the evil dragon Tolfida and rescue the princess.

Gameplay 

King's Knight is a vertically scrolling shooter, where the main objective is to dodge or destroy all onscreen enemies and obstacles. Various items, however, add depth to the game. As any character, the player can collect various power-ups to increase a character's level (maximum of twenty levels per character): as many as seven Jump Increases, seven Speed Increases, three Weapon Increases, and three Shield Increases. There are also Life Ups, which are collected to increase the character's life meter. There are also Life Downs which should be avoided. Other onscreen icons can affect the stage, such as hidden cave entrances/exits and a "secret revealer," which reveals hidden stones that block progress. Finally, there are four types of elements to be collected in each level, which are vital to the completion of the last stage. These elements are simply elements A, B, C, and D.

Each stage has various power-ups, an element of each type, and a cave. Because caves in any given level always house at least one element type (not to mention various power-ups), it is vital that the player finds these. Caves are always hidden and are generally found in the middle of a stage. Caves also have statues that shoot fireballs, and at the end of each cave is a dragon to fight. Once the dragon is defeated, the player can exit the cave and continue with the level.

Development and release

Differences between versions 

Differences were present not only in the Famicom and MSX versions of King's Knight, but in the Japanese and North American versions as well.

The Japanese (Famicom) version and the American (NES) version of King's Knight differed little, with the title screen being the only disparity. Each title screen reflected the copyright and publisher.

The MSX version of King's Knight differed from the Famicom version in a variety of ways. The opening was modified so that prior to the intro screen, players could specify what type of controller they would like to use (either a keyboard or a joystick). The in-game dynamics were very similar, although some differences exist. In the MSX version, the flanks of the screen were "closed off," while the stage maps have moved slightly, and so some of the items appear to be out of their original locations. Finally, the MSX version may seem easier, because the characters can sustain more damage from attacks.

The developers also took advantage of technological capabilities available on the MSX. As an upgrade, the MSX port featured more sound channels than the Famicom, and as such many music tracks and sound effects were altered or improved. The MSX version also boasts a wider range of colors, updated graphics, new monster and boss designs (dragons at the end of caves, for example, were replaced with reptilian monsters), and a new sidebar, which displayed the player's life meter, allocated power-ups, and allocated elements. The MSX could not smoothly render vertical scrolling though – unlike the Famicom – so the movement of the graphics is very "choppy" in comparison. Some of these changes are very similar to the changes that took place when Square's Final Fantasy was ported to the MSX2.

Remake 

On September 18, 2016, Square Enix announced a remake titled King's Knight: Wrath of the Dark Dragon for iOS and Android. It was produced by Daisuke Motohashi and developed by Flame Hearts. Developed as a mobile spin-off associated with Final Fantasy XV, the game borrows the original version's scrolling, action role-playing game style and adds a new camera perspective and an orchestral version of the former's chiptune soundtrack. The game is free-to-play with a four-player multiplayer mode.

Square Enix announced the game at the September 2016 Tokyo Game Show. Its promotional material placed the game in the Final Fantasy XV universe alongside Justice Monsters Five, another mobile companion game to the series that Square Enix announced earlier in 2016. King's Knight: Wrath of the Dark Dragon was planned for release on Android and iOS platforms in Japan in 2016, with no announcement for a North American release. The game's release was then postponed to 2017. It was released worldwide on September 13, 2017. End of service was subsequently announced for the game to take place June 26, 2018 - less than a year after its worldwide release.

Other media 
King's Knight is one of the video games to be adapted into a manga titled , published in the Gamest Comics collection from April 1999, and drawn by Kouta Hirano.

Reception 

In a retrospective review AllGame editor Skyler Miller was critical of the game. Miller noted that "the underlying gameplay is decent" but described the graphics as "elementary" and "the structure of switching characters is awkward and frustrating". Miller noted that the game showed "none of the creativity or innovation that Square would later be known for".

King's Knight was given a 3/10 on IGN and 3/10 as well on Nintendo Life.

Notes

References

External links 
  

1986 video games
MSX games
Nintendo Entertainment System games
Sharp X1 games
NEC PC-8801 games
Vertically scrolling shooters
Square (video game company) games
Video games developed in Japan
Video games scored by Nobuo Uematsu
Video games set in castles
Virtual Console games
Permadeath games
Single-player video games